Samuel Leo LoPresti (January 30, 1917 – December 11, 1984) was an American ice hockey goaltender. He played several senior and professional seasons between 1937 and 1951, including two seasons in the National Hockey League (NHL) for the Chicago Black Hawks. He was named an American Hockey Association (AHA) all-star in 1939–40 and the most valuable player of the United States Hockey League in 1949–50. He is best known for his performance with the Black Hawks on March 4, 1941, when he set an NHL record by facing 83 shots in a regulation game against the Boston Bruins. He was inducted into the United States Hockey Hall of Fame in 1973.

LoPresti left the NHL during the Second World War to join the United States Navy where he served on board the SS Roger B. Taney. The ship was torpedoed during a crossing of the Atlantic Ocean and sunk in 1943; LoPresti was one of 29 sailors who survived 42 days lost at sea in a single lifeboat before being rescued off the coast of Brazil. LoPresti was credited with saving the lives of his shipmates by killing a dolphin with a sheath knife, providing nearly the only food they had during their ordeal.

Early life
LoPresti was born January 30, 1917, in Elcor, Minnesota, though he grew up in the nearby community of Eveleth. He played football as a youth, playing at tackle and fullback. He had never worn a pair of ice skates until the ninth grade. However, inspired by local players Frank Brimsek and Mike Karakas, he took up the position of goaltender and was his high school team's starter by his final year of high school. He played for local junior colleges where he was scouted by the American Hockey Association (AHA)'s St. Paul Saints.

Playing career

In his first season with the Saints, 1937–38, LoPresti appeared in 48 games, posting a 10–38–2 win-loss-tie record and a 3.62 goals against average (GAA). He improved to 23–21–2 the following season. In his third season in St. Paul, LoPresti was named to the league's second all-star team after recording 29 wins and 4 shutouts. The Saints won the AHA championship, defeating the Omaha Knights in four games, LoPresti posted a 6–1 record and 1.29 GAA during the playoffs.

During that season, he was discovered by Bill Tobin and Paul Thompson, president and coach of the NHL's Chicago Black Hawks, during an exhibition game between the two teams. He was signed by Chicago, and began the season with the AHA's Kansas City Americans. LoPresti was recalled to Chicago when goaltender Paul Goodman retired. He made his NHL debut on January 5, 1941, and went unbeaten in his first four starts. He appeared in 27 games with Chicago, finishing with a record of 9–15–3. He made NHL history on March 4 in a game against the Boston Bruins. He faced a league record 83 shots in a regulation, 60 minute game. It took Boston 42 shots to beat LoPresti for their first goal, and kept the Black Hawks close in what was ultimately a 3–2 Boston victory.

As Chicago's top goaltender in the 1941–42 NHL season, LoPresti won 21 games against 23 losses. He was his team's star in the Black Hawks' 1942 Stanley Cup playoff series against the Bruins. He recorded one playoff shutout to go with three in the regular season, but Chicago was eliminated by Boston. He then left the NHL to join the United States Navy during the Second World War, theorizing that "it was safer to face Nazi U-boats in the North Atlantic than vulcanized rubber in North America."

Military service
LoPresti joined the Navy's armed guard service and served aboard the SS Roger B. Taney as a gunner's mate, assigned to duty protecting ships as they crossed the Atlantic Ocean. The ship was torpedoed and sunk during an Atlantic crossing in February 1943. Listed as missing in action, LoPresti was thought to be the first casualty among American professional athletes in the conflict.

As the Roger B. Taney sank, LoPresti and the other Naval Armed Guards abandoned the ship on rafts, which were picked up the next morning by the lifeboats. He was one of 26 men who took refuge in the number 4 lifeboat with minimal water or food supplies. LoPresti was credited with saving the men's lives by catching the only real food they had during their entire ordeal after noticing dolphins swimming around their boat on one occasion. According to another sailor, LoPresti improvised a weapon by lashing a sheath knife to a boat hook. He plunged into the ocean, catching a  dolphin. They hauled it into the boat, drank its blood, and cooked the meat in a metal bucket with rags and kerosene.

Later career and personal life
LoPresti returned to hockey following his ordeal, but never played in the NHL again. He played two seasons in California with the San Diego Skyhawks before returning to his Minnesota home to play several seasons of senior hockey in Duluth and Eveleth. He was named the most valuable player of the North America Hockey League in 1949–50 as a member of the Eveleth Rangers, and retired from hockey in 1951. He was a charter member of the United States Hockey Hall of Fame, inducted in 1973.

LoPresti married his wife Carol in 1941, and operated a tavern in Eveleth following his playing career. His son Pete was also an NHL player. Pete was also a goaltender, making him and Sam the first father-son goaltenders in NHL history.

Death
LoPresti died of a heart attack at his home in Eveleth, Minnesota on December 11, 1984.

Career statistics

Regular season and playoffs

See also
List of people who disappeared mysteriously at sea

References
Career statistics:

External links
 
 

1917 births
1940s missing person cases
1984 deaths
20th-century American businesspeople
American men's ice hockey goaltenders
Businesspeople from Minnesota
Chicago Blackhawks players
Eveleth Rangers players
Formerly missing people
Ice hockey players from Minnesota
Kansas City Americans players
Military personnel from Minnesota
Missing in action of World War II
Shipwreck survivors
Sportspeople from Eveleth, Minnesota
People from St. Louis County, Minnesota
St. Paul Saints (AHA) players
United States Hockey Hall of Fame inductees
United States Navy personnel of World War II
United States Navy sailors